Boualem Amirouche (born 1 October 1942) is an Algerian footballer. He played in eleven matches for the Algeria national football team from 1966 to 1971. He was also named in Algeria's squad for the 1968 African Cup of Nations tournament.

References

External links
 

1942 births
Living people
Algerian footballers
Algeria international footballers
1968 African Cup of Nations players
Association football forwards
People from Kouba
21st-century Algerian people